This is a list of notable people from Alaska.  This list includes individuals who were born in Alaska, grew up there, retired there, or in any other fashion lived there, even if for only a brief period of time.

Key to table entries:
Name
Year born
Year died
Communities lived in in Alaska
Noted for

A

B

C

D

E

F

G

H

I

J

K

L

M

N

O

Rashard Odomes (born 1996), basketball player in the Israeli Basketball Premier League

P

Q

R

S

T

U

V

W

X

Y

Z

People associated with Alaska
 Edward Albee (1928–2016), main person responsible for building the Last Frontier Theatre Conference in Valdez to the status it has currently achieved
 Henry Tureman Allen (1859–1930), U.S. Army officer who conducted a famous expedition of Alaska's interior in 1885, largely through the Copper and Tanana River drainages
 Roald Amundsen (1872–1928), frequently passed through Alaska in his travels
 Hubert Howe Bancroft (1832–1918), whose 19th-century published history of Alaska, part of a larger series, formed an important foundation for later study of Alaskan history
 Alexander Baranof (1746–1819)
 Vitus Bering (1681–1741), made the first recorded European sighting of Alaska
 Hale Boggs (1914–1972), member of the U.S. House from Louisiana, who disappeared on a flight in Alaska along with freshman colleague Nick Begich while helping Begich campaign for reelection
 Jackson Browne (born 1948), stated in a 1980s interview that he was conceived in Alaska, while his father was stationed there in the U.S. military
 Simon Bolivar Buckner Jr. (1886–1945), military commander of Alaska early in World War II
 Sydney Chapman (1888–1970), mathematician and geophysicist; Advisory Scientific Director of the Geophysical Institute at the University of Alaska from 1951 until his death, where he was largely responsible for building the programs and reputation of the Institute in its early years
 James Cook (1728–1779), British explorer whose voyages included several trips along Alaska's coastline
 William Healey Dall (1845–1927), biologist, hydrographer; explored interior Alaska, charted the Aleutians; America's pre-eminent authority on Alaska 1866–1900 
 Brad Davis (born 1955), played briefly for the Anchorage Northern Knights before going on to a long career with the Dallas Mavericks, both as a player and in other capacities
 Edna Ferber (1885–1968), friend of Ernest Gruening; following the success of Giant, was convinced by Gruening to write Ice Palace as a tool to promote Alaskan statehood
 Joseph Hazelwood (born 1946), captain of the Exxon Valdez when it ran aground and spilled oil in 1989
 Michael A. Healy (1839–1904), captain of the USRC Corwin and USRC Bear when they were the only law enforcement presence north of Sitka
 Eric Holmback (1924–1965), professional wrestler of the 1950s and 1960s known as "Yukon Eric," was billed (declared by the promoter and/or ring announcer as hailing) from Fairbanks. Other wrestlers, such as Jay York (who was also briefly a member of the rock group Delaney & Bonnie) and King Kong Bundy (while wrestling in Texas during the early 1980s), also portrayed wrestling personas associated with Alaska.
 Michio Hoshino (1952–1996), photographer
 Jack London (1876–1916), writer
 Christopher McCandless (1968–1992), hiker, ad hoc adventurer
 John Muir (1838–1914), writer, explorer, naturalist; made and wrote about several trips to Alaska; explored Glacier Bay
 Wiley Post (1898–1935), aviator who died in a plane crash in Alaska along with Will Rogers (see below) while making a flight through the territory
 Ralph Regula (1924–2017), longtime member of the U.S. House representing Canton, Ohio, the hometown of William McKinley.  Regula devoted much of his career to preserving McKinley's legacy, and maintained a decades–long effort in Congress to prevent the renaming of Mount McKinley to its native name Denali.
 Will Rogers (1879–1935), actor and humorist, died in a plane crash in Alaska along with Wiley Post while making a flight through the territory
 Robert W. Service (1874–1958), due to influence from Gold Rush migration across the North Country, Service became Alaskans' most well–loved poet, despite actually living in the Yukon Territory.
 Vilhjalmur Stefansson (1879–1962), frequently passed through Alaska in his travels
 Timothy Treadwell (1957–2003), bear enthusiast
 Naomi Uemura (1941–1984), adventurer, mountain climber, died while attempting a solo ascent of Mount McKinley
 Bradford Washburn (1910–2007), mountaineer, geographer
 Cal Worthington (1920–2013), purchased Anchorage dealership Friendly Ford in 1976 and renamed it Cal Worthington Ford, which his company still owns and operates along with other Anchorage dealerships. He has been a ubiquitous figure on Anchorage television for decades, as well as the subject of parodies and other cultural depictions originating from Alaska.

See also

Elected officials
 List of governors of Alaska
 List of lieutenant governors of Alaska
 List of mayors of Anchorage, Alaska
 List of mayors of Cordova, Alaska
 List of mayors of Fairbanks, Alaska
 List of mayors of Juneau, Alaska
 List of speakers of the Alaska House of Representatives
 List of United States senators from Alaska
 United States congressional delegations from Alaska

Others
 List of Alaskan aviators
 List of Alaska suffragists
 List of Alaskan Hall of Fame pilots
 List of athletes from Alaska
 List of justices of the Alaska Supreme Court

References